Vladimir Vladimirov may be:
Vladimir Vladimirov, Bulgarian footballer, born 1986
Vladimir Fedorovich Vladimirov, 1914-1943, Russian soldier
Vladimir Vladimirov (politician), Russian official